The Vénus was a  of the French Navy. She was captured in 1810 by the Royal Navy, and taken into British service as HMS Nereide. She was broken up in 1816.

French service
On 10 November 1808, she departed Cherbourg, bound for Île de France, where she served as Rear-Adm Hamelin's flagship, leading a squadron also comprising the frigate Manche and the sloop Créole.

On the 29 and 30 December 1808, she captured and destroyed the East Indiamen Hiran and Albion. On 4 November 1809, she captured the East Indiaman Lady Bentick and the American merchantman Samson.

She was central in the action of 18 November 1809, where the squadron captured three armed East Indiamen, including Windham.

From 20 to 26 August 1810, Vénus  took a minor part in the Battle of Grand Port.

On 17–18 September 1810, along with the privateer corvette Victor, Vénus  captured the 40-gun HMS Ceylon, losing her fore-mast and her topgallant masts in the process. The next day, a British squadron composed of HMS Boadicea, HMS Otter and the brig HMS Staunch captured Vénus and recaptured Ceylon. Victor managed to escape.

British service
Vénus was brought into British service as HMS Nereide, in honour of the defence of HMS Nereide at Grand Port. She subsequently took part in the blockade and surrender of Île de France.

Fate
She was broken up in 1816.

References

Gloire-class frigates
Age of Sail frigates of France
Ships built in France
1806 ships
Captured ships